Arnoldus Leonardus Henricus Roderik Bouwman (born 24 March 1957 in Haarlem) is a former Dutch field hockey player, who played 107 international matches for the Netherlands, in which the striker scored 82 goals.

He was a member of the Holland squad that finished sixth at the 1984 Summer Olympics in Los Angeles, California. Bouwman made his debut on 19 August 1978 in a friendly match against England. He played in the Dutch League for Amsterdam, Stichtse Cricket en Hockey Club and HGC. His father Henk was also a skillful field hockey player, who competed at the 1948 Summer Olympics in London.

References

External links
 
Dutch Hockey Federation

1957 births
Dutch male field hockey players
Field hockey players at the 1984 Summer Olympics
Living people
Olympic field hockey players of the Netherlands
Sportspeople from Haarlem
SCHC players
HGC players